Sceaux is a former commune in the Yonne department in Bourgogne-Franche-Comté in north-central France. On 1 January 2019, it was merged into the new commune Guillon-Terre-Plaine.

See also
Communes of the Yonne department

References

Former communes of Yonne
Populated places disestablished in 2019